The Department of Plant & Microbial Biology is an academic department in the College of Natural Resources at the University of California, Berkeley. The department conducts extensive research, provides undergraduate and graduate programs, and educates students in the fields of plant and microbial sciences with 43 department faculty members.

The Plant Biology program focuses on contemporary basic plant research and design of biotechnologies. New discoveries have broadened the understanding of plant development and function, and provided tools for engineering plants that produce novel new crops, with better resistance to disease and insects. With an increasing awareness of environmental problems, global changes, and emerging food needs, plants have emerged as a focal point for new research initiatives and educational training programs.

The Department established the Division of Microbial Biology to understand the microbial world to comprehend the global ecosystem, evolutionary history, and diversity of life on earth. The twenty-first century brings a new understanding of the workings of the global ecosystem and a wealth of new technologies derived from the microbial world.

The Department also offers an extensive public education program as part of the California Cooperative Extension Service.

As the key research and training program of the Agricultural Experiment Station in the California Division of Agriculture and Natural Resources, this Division operates at a strategic location near California’s major agricultural production centers and within the San Francisco Bay Area, a hub for innovative biotechnology.

Plant Biology's partnership with the United States Department of Agriculture's Plant Gene Expression Center offers a model for successful collaborations between the University and other government agencies.

Research is largely funded through grants from the National Institute of Health, USDA and National Science Foundation. Extensive research is conducted Koshland Hall on the UC Berkeley campus and the nearby Energy Biosciences Institute, which is directed by a PMB faculty member.

The department also utilizes the fields and greenhouses of the nearby Oxford Tract for research.

Students in the undergraduate division graduate with a Bachelor of Science. The Graduate division offers Ph.D degrees and opportunities for students to participate in postdoctoral research.

The department headquarters along with many faculty offices and laboratories are located in Koshland Hall. The Biological Imaging Facility, in Koshland Hall, provides instructional and research support for modern biological light microscopy including laser scanning, confocal and deconvolution microscopy, computer image processing and analysis, FISH, and immunolocalization. The Genetics and Plant Biology building, situated on the northwest side of the campus, was built in 1999. It is the main teaching site for lectures and laboratory courses offered by the Plant and Microbial Biology department.

Research strengths in the Plant and Microbial Biology department are in the areas of plant and microbial genetics, biochemistry, ecology, evolution, pathology, development, physiology, cell biology and molecular biology. The department grants undergraduate degrees in: Microbial Biology, Genetics and Plant Biology. Graduate degrees are offered in Microbiology and Plant Biology. Many faculty in the department conduct research on plant-microbe interactions. The faculty and graduate students also cooperate with faculty from other UC Berkeley departments, such as the Molecular and Cell Biology Department, on researches pertaining to plant genetics and microbial biology.
.

References

External links
Department Plant & Microbial Biology

University of California, Berkeley
Science and technology in the San Francisco Bay Area